(), meaning "wrapped", refers to a dish in Korean cuisine in which, usually, leafy vegetables are used to wrap a piece of meat such as pork or other filling.

History
Under the Buddhist influence that was especially strong during the Kingdom of Goryeo, killing and eating an animal was highly discouraged. This has led numerous Korean vegetable dishes, especially ssam, to be created and emerge as a prominent dish during the era. After its emergence, the dish was mentioned numerous times in the ancient Korean records.  
 
The ancient Korean book of customs Dongguksesigi noted that the women of Goryeo who were taken as servants by the Yuan dynasty made and ate ssam to have the taste of their home country's food and soothe homesickness. The same book also noted that ssam had become an established seasonal dish by the Joseon era, which was especially eaten as a festive dish during the day of Daeboreum. The ssam eaten during Daeboreum was believed to bring a good fortune and called , which meant "fortune ssam". 

Ssam has also been mentioned by the numerous literatures in the Joseon era. One of them is Eou yadam, the Korean collection of stories written by the Joseon scholar Yu Mong-In. In the book, the author described the story of wrapping a sardine in a leafy vegetable with rice and ssamjang. In Sasojeol (士小節), the ancient book which explained the basic etiquettes and manners during Joseon era, the author Lee deok-mu said it is a manner to scoop and roll a ball of rice first before wrapping it with a vegetable from atop while eating ssam. He also told readers to wrap a ssam in a bitable size as it looked rude to puff the one's cheeks while eating. Jeong yak-yong, a highly notable Joseon intellectual, described in his poem about putting gochujang, the traditional Korean red chili paste, and the root of green onion on a lettuce along with rice to eat a ssam.  

Ssam from Goryeo was also recognized in the poem by Yang Yunfu of Yuan dynasty. In his poem, Yang noted how the people of Goryeo eat rice by wrapping it with raw vegetables and complimented the pleasant scent of Goryeo's lettuce. 

In modern days, ssam is slowly gaining popularity outside of Korea and is being served at restaurants in various locations such as New York City, Tokyo and Brisbane.

Variations
Various vegetables are used as ingredients such as lettuce, cabbage, bean leaves, and pumpkin leaves, which are used either raw or blanched. Depending on one's taste, Ssam can contain side dishes such as kimchi (김치) and garlic, and sauce such as ssamjang (쌈장), doenjang (된장), red pepper paste (고추장), and oil sauce. Sashimi and gwamegi (과메기) are also eaten with wraps.

By ingredients

 : with steamed pork, e.g. shoulder and is a popular dish throughout Korea.
  is a dish in which rice is included.

By wrap type
Specific types:
 , wrapped with napa cabbage leaf
 , wrapped with 
 , wrapped with thin fish filet
 , wrapped with dried persimmon
 , wrapped with pumpkin leaf
 , wrapped with sliced and soaked dried abalone
 , wrapped with kimchi
 , wrapped with perilla leaf
 , wrapped with a thin crepe made from wheat flour 
 , wrapped with sliced octopus 
 , wrapped with seasoned raw beef
 , wrapped with lettuce

Gallery

See also

Sandwich wrap

Korean cuisine
Korean taco

References

External links

Korean cuisine
Meat dishes